José de Grimaldo y Gutiérrez de Solórzano, 1st Marquess of Grimaldo (1660–1733) was a Spanish statesman.

Early life
Grimaldo was born in Madrid in 1660 to a wealthy family who had gained experience serving in the administration of the colonies of the Spanish Empire. In 1683 he was admitted into the Order of Santiago as a gesture to his parentage, but while he began to be acknowledged as a rising politician he failed to gain any serious appointment in government until the 1690s when the old dynasty died out.

War of the Spanish Succession
Grimaldo became a follower of the politician Jean Orry who had arrived in Madrid in 1695. Grimaldo was found a position in the Ministry of War and Finance. He continued in this position throughout the War of the Spanish Succession.

Chief Minister

First Spell

Grimaldo became Secretary of State for the first time in 1714. It was a turbulent era for Spain, as they had been forced to accept the loss of huge amounts of territory (particularly to Austria in Italy, as well as losing Minorca and Gibraltar to Britain). Grimaldo helped to re-assert Spain, rebuilding its shattered army and navy.

Second Spell and Retirement
When the King briefly stepped down in 1724, often attributed to a fit of madness or a desire to be considered a claimant to the French throne, Grimaldo left office with him. When the King returned after only a year Grimaldo came with him, but was now increasingly in bad health and he was forced to retire from government. In 1733 he was made a Marquess, and died the same year at the age of seventy three.

See also
 List of prime ministers of Spain

References

1660 births
1733 deaths
Spanish untitled nobility
Knights of the Golden Fleece of Spain
Prime Ministers of Spain